Kamyshinsky Uyezd was an administrative division (an uyezd) of Saratov Governorate in the Russian Empire and the early Russian SFSR. It existed in various forms in 1780–1928. A large part of the district's population were Volga Germans who spoke German. Almost 75% of all German speakers within Saratov Governorate lived in the uyezd according to the 1897, census.

Demographics

Language
 Population by mother tongue according to the Imperial census of 1897.

References
 The First General Census of the Russian Empire of 1897. Breakdown of population by mother tongue and districts in 50 Governorates of the European Russia (1777 territorial units)

 
Uezds of Saratov Governorate
Saratov Governorate